Insurance Economics is a research programme set up by the Geneva Association, also known as the International Association for the Study of Insurance Economics.

It is dedicated to making an original contribution to the progress of insurance through promoting studies of the interdependence between economics and insurance, to highlight the importance of risk and insurance economics as part of the modern general economic theory, to detect and define special aims for research programmes in risk and insurance economics, to stimulate and support academic and professional research work in risk and insurance economics throughout the world, and to diffuse knowledge and the results of research in risk and insurance economics worldwide. The Geneva Association has been the founding institution of the European Group of Risk and Insurance Economists (EGRIE) one of worldwide now three regional organisations that organise (mostly) academic experts in the fields of risk and insurance economics. The Geneva Association is furthermore the catalytical non-academic organisation for the arrangement of the first world congress for risk and insurance economists which was jointly organised by ARIA, APRIA, EGRIE and the Geneva Association in 2005 in Salt Lake City.

The modern world has greatly increased the economic and financial performances and reliability. Conversely, the perception of risks and vulnerabilities - as a consequence of a higher level of knowledge - has increased to the point of producing feelings on insecurity.

Selected key issues

 Further develop our understanding of the underlying theories concerning risk perception, management, transfer, and mitigation;
 Analyse and describe the mechanics of ideal and real insurance markets. Their organisation, functioning, role, and limitations;
 Work on the limits and complementary of public and private solutions to risk and insurance problems.

Publications

 Insurance Economics, Geneva Association Information Newsletter, The Geneva Association
 Etudes et Dossiers, Working Paper Series, The Geneva Association
 The Geneva Risk and Insurance Review, formerly The Geneva Papers on Risk and Insurance Theory (until March 2005), The Geneva Association & Springer
 Law and Economics, International Liability Regimes, The Geneva Papers on Risk and Insurance - Issues and Practice, Vol.31 - No.2 / April 2006, Palgrave Macmillan
 Insurance Law and Economics, Regulation and Financial Stability, The Geneva Papers on Risk and Insurance - Issues and Practice, Vol.29 - No.2 / April 2004, Palgrave Macmillan
 Economic Issues in Insurance, Social Issues in Insurance, Insurance Worldwide, The Geneva Papers on Risk and Insurance - Issues and Practice, Vol.26 - No.3 / July 2001, Palgrave Macmillan
 Issues in Law and Economics, Financial Services and Insurance, The Geneva Papers on Risk and Insurance - Issues and Practice, Vol.25 - No.2 / April 2000, Palgrave Macmillan
 Issues in Law and Economics, The Geneva Papers on Risk and Insurance - Issues and Practice, No.87 / April 1998
 The Law and Economics of Insurance, The Geneva Papers on Risk and Insurance - Issues and Practice, No.78 / January 1996
 World Insurance, Economics Issues, The Geneva Papers on Risk and Insurance - Issues and Practice, No.75 / April 1995
 The Law and Economics of Insurance and of Services, The Geneva Papers on Risk and Insurance - Issues and Practice, No.70 / January 1994
 The Economics of Insurance, The Geneva Papers on Risk and Insurance - Issues and Practice, No.66 / January 1993
 Essays in Insurance Economics, The Geneva Papers on Risk and Insurance - Issues and Practice, No.50 / January 1989
 Essays in Insurance Economics, The Geneva Papers on Risk and Insurance - Issues and Practice, No.47 / April 1988
 Essays in Insurance Economics, The Geneva Papers on Risk and Insurance - Issues and Practice, No.42 / January 1987

References

External links
 The Geneva Association website (known as the International Association for the Study of Insurance Economics) 
 The EGRIE website, the European Group of Risk and Insurance Economists
 The World Congress website, the World Risk and Insurance Economics Congress
 The APRIA website, Asia-Pacific Risk and Insurance Association
 The ARIA website, the American Risk and Insurance Association

Economics societies
Think tanks based in Switzerland
Insurance industry organizations